Kathryn Mary Garner (born 9 July 1954) is a British photographer, fine artist and singer.

Early life
Born in Wigan, Lancashire to Anne Philomena Shannon and George Sandeman Garner, a factory worker and a sailor, Garner was expelled from high school at the age of 16, and became a runaway who joined The Children of God. To escape the grasp of the cult she hitchhiked from London through Eastern Europe to India in 1970, where she lived for a year as a traveller before being located by her parents. She attended art school at Blackpool in northern England; later she moved to London, where she began to both photograph and model for up and coming magazines such as The Face and i-D.

Career
Garner first came into the public eye as one third of the 1980s avant-garde, new wave pop project Haysi Fantayzee, along with other members Jeremy Healy and Paul Caplin. Emanating from street arts scenes such as the Blitz Kids that were cropping up in London in the early 1980s, Haysi Fantayzee's music combined reggae, country and electro with political and sociological lyrics couched as nursery rhymes.

Catapulted to stardom by their visual sensibilities, Haysi Fantayzee combined their extreme clothes sense – described as combining white Rasta, tribal chieftain and Dickensian styles – with a quirky musical sound comparable to other new wave musical pop acts of the era, such as Bow Wow Wow, Adam and the Ants and Bananarama. They appeared several times on the BBC Television programme Top of the Pops. Despite being touted by David Bowie's producer Tony Visconti as the next big thing, the group quickly disbanded after releasing three hit singles "John Wayne Is Big Leggy", "Shiny Shiny" and "Holy Joe", and an album, Battle Hymns for Children Singing, that went gold.

Garner then returned to painting, photography and video, launching a successful media arts career, starting with her collaboration with Sinéad O'Connor, in which she created memorable images of O'Connor for her 1987 debut, The Lion and the Cobra. Garner has since photographed a wide range of musicians and celebrities, including Dr. Dre, Eazy E Leigh Bowery, Patti Smith, Angelina Jolie, Cate Blanchett, Iggy Pop, David Bowie, Cameron Diaz, PJ Harvey, John Galliano, Björk and Kate Moss. Her work has appeared in the American and British versions of Vogue and Harper's Bazaar as well as W magazine, Interview, i-D, The Face, GQ, Vanity Fair, Elle and The Sunday Times. 

She had her first multimedia exhibition in February 2007 at the Painter's Gallery on Charing Cross Road, London, and a year later had an exhibition in San Francisco, California, titled 'Identity Artists'. She has shown at/with Galerie13 in Paris., Artcube in Paris, Bankrobber Gallery,London, Zebra One Gallery in Hampstead, London and The Lawrence Alkin Contemporary Art Gallery, Soho, London. Her work has appeared at the Affordable Art Fair in London 2009, Brussels 2010 and Paris 2010, London 2012. She was sponsored by the Arts Council for her show at The Future Gallery, off Charing Cross Road, in January 2010.

She designed a wallpaper collection, which is archived at the Victoria and Albert Museum in London, and was in a touring exhibition with the Whitworth Gallery from 2010 to 2012.

References

External links
Interview about her life and photography on Maledetti Fotografi
Kate Garner's page at Zebra One Gallery (archived)
Kate Garner's own page

1954 births
Living people
English women singers
Photographers from Lancashire
Women new wave singers
People from Wigan